Melgaço is a municipality in Viana do Castelo District in Portugal. The population in 2011 was 9,213, in an area of 238.25 km². It is the northernmost municipality in Portugal.

The present Mayor is Manoel Batista, elected by the Socialist Party. The municipal holiday is Ascension Day.

History
Parada do Monte, Gave and the plateau of Castro Laboreiro were locations of many megalithic burial mounds and graves that suggest the presence of human settlement in the mountains of the region. Alongside is the hilltop castle, that stood firm during the Galician-Leonese battles.

Over the streams they built bridges in solid masonry, while dozens of fishing villages sprung from the banks of the River Minho, in addition to the Romanesque convents, churches and chapels, some of which are quite Romanesque. Oral tradition suggest that the castle of Melgaço was constructed during the reign of King D. Afonso Henriques, around 1170. It was this monarch that conceded to Melgaço the first forum letter, between 1183 and 1185, that was later confirmed by King D. Afonso in 1219, and replaced by a Foral (charter) issued by King D. Afonso III, in 1258. The existence of a forum letter suggests that some settlement existed on the site.

The hilltop of Melgaço, overlooking the Minho River, was strategically located enroute to Galicia, in addition to terrestrial commercial routes. In the neighbourhood were the protectorates of two great monasteries, in Fiães and Paderne. The small burg required further protection from Leonese forces, resulting in the construction of a larger structure, on a site that would later be erected the keep tower. It was during the reign of King D. Sancho II that the town began to be encircled by a defensive fortification. Its need was already evident in the reign of King D. Afonso II, during the politico-military battles that were motivated by the monarch's struggles with his sisters. Between 1211-1212, the north of Portugal was invaded by Leonese forces, justifying the construction of the wall, which was already under construction by 1245, with the help of local initiatives and the convent of Fiães.

Geography

Administratively, the municipality is divided into 13 civil parishes:
 Alvaredo
 Castro Laboreiro e Lamas de Mouro
 Chaviães e Paços
 Cousso
 Cristoval
 Fiães
 Gave
 Paderne
 Parada do Monte e Cubalhão
 Penso
 Prado e Remoães
 São Paio
 Vila e Roussas

Climate

Architecture

Civic
 Bridge of Cava da Velha
 Cinema Museum of Melgaço, established by French film critic Jean-Loup Passek
 Fountain of São João
 Settlement of Laboreiro
 Thermal Spa of Peso

Military
 Castle of Castro Laboreiro
 Castle of Melgaço

Religious
 Church of the Divino Salvador de Paderne
 Church of Santo André
 Church of São Martinho

References

External links

Melgaço Photographs